Sithurajapuram is an area of Sivakasi Corporation in Virudhunagar district in the Indian state of Tamil Nadu.
There is a phc in sithurajapuram run by the government of Tamil Nadu.

Demographics
 India census, Sithurajapuram had a population of 12,933. Males constitute 50% of the population and females 50%. Sithurajapuram has an average literacy rate of 73%, higher than the national average of 59.5%: male literacy is 79%, and female literacy is 66%. In Sithurajapuram, 11% of the population is under 6 years of age.

References

Cities and towns in Virudhunagar district